Afro-Trinidadians and Tobagonians (or just Afro-Trinbagonians) are people from Trinidad and Tobago who are of West African descent. Social interpretations of race in Trinidad and Tobago are often used to dictate who is of West African descent. Mulatto-Creole, Dougla, Blasian, Zambo, Maroon, Pardo, Quadroon, Octoroon or Hexadecaroon (Quintroon) were all racial terms used to measure the amount of West African ancestry someone possessed in Trinidad and Tobago and throughout North American, Latin American and Caribbean history.

Afro-Trinidadians and Tobagonians accounted for 34.22 percent of the population of Trinidad and Tobago according to the 2011 Census. However, the classification is primarily a superficial description based on phenotypical (physical) description as opposed to genotypical (genetic) classification. An additional 22.8 percent of Trinidadians described themselves as being multiracial, of whom 7.7 percent were Dougla (mixed African and Indian ethnicity).

The islands of Trinidad and Tobago (united in 1888) have a different racial history. The island of Trinidad is mainly multiracial while the population of Tobago is primarily what is considered Afro-Tobagonian, which is synonymous with Afro-Trinidadian, with the exception that the people of Tobago are almost exclusively of direct African ancestry. In an effort to bridge the cultural and ethnic split between the two islands many people choose to be called Trinbagonians as a gesture of unification.

Origins

The ultimate origin of most African ancestry in the Americas is in West and Central Africa. The most common ethnic groups of the enslaved Africans in Trinidad and Tobago were Igbo, Kongo, Ibibio, Yoruba and Malinke people. All of these groups, among others, were heavily affected by the Atlantic slave trade. The population census of 1813 shows that among African-born slaves the Igbo were the most numerous.

Around half of Afro-Trinidadians were the descendants of emigrants from other islands of the Caribbean, especially Martinique, Guadeloupe, Saint Vincent and Grenada. Other Afro-Trinidadians trace their ancestry to American slaves recruited to fight for the British in the War of 1812 or from indentured labourers from West Africa.

History
In 1498 Christopher Columbus landed on the island of Trinidad, where he encountered the indigenous Taíno people. A while after Columbus's landing, Trinidad became a territory of the Spanish Empire. The Spanish enslaved the native population and over time mixed with them, their offspring creating the Mestizo identity. The Mulattos came about after Spain started transporting enslaved Africans to Trinidad in 1517 via the Atlantic slave trade. By the time the African, Mulattoes and Mestizos started intermixing, the Amerindians had become almost nonexistent.

In 1783, the King of Spain passed the Cedula of Population law, which promised free land to Europeans willing to relocate to Trinidad to work. With this law French settlers migrated to Trinidad from the French Antilles to work the sugar cane plantations. They, too, added to the ancestry of Trinidadians, creating the creole identity; Spanish, French and Patois were the languages spoken.

In 1802, Great Britain took over the island and slavery was eventually abolished in 1834. The abolition of slavery led to an influx of indentured servants from places such as China. While some left, many stayed and married into the Trinidadian populace. In 1911, many more Chinese came after the Chinese Revolution.

In the 1840s, European indentured servants began arriving, including the French, Spanish, Germans, Swiss, Portuguese, English, Scottish, Welsh, Cornish, Irish, Corsican, Italians, Dutch, Norwegian and Polish. Over time, many of these settlers married into the families of the freed slaves.

On 30 May 1845, the British transported indentured servants from India to Trinidad. This day is known as Indian Arrival Day. A small portion of the group of Indians also began to racially mix into the Trinidadian populace, their descendants became known as the Dougla people. After the use of indentured servants was abolished 1917, a second group of Indians steadily migrated to Trinidad from India, mostly for business.

Contemporary migration
Nigerians, Demographics of Nigeria, Emigration from Africa, Jamaican diaspora

Use of Afro-Trinidadian and Tobagonian

Afro-Trinidadian and Tobagonian
Between 1968 and 1970, the "Black Power Revolution" gained strength in Trinidad and Tobago. The National Joint Action Committee (NJAC) was formed by a group of undergraduates at the St. Augustine Campus of the University of the West Indies. Influenced by people such as Fidel Castro, Stokely Carmichael and Malcolm X. The National Joint Action Committee demonstrated to bring about Black Power and a return to African heritage and African culture.

On 6 April 1970, protester Basil Davis, was killed by the police. This was followed on 13 April by the resignation of A. N. R. Robinson, Member of Parliament for Tobago East. On 18 April, sugar workers went on strike and there was talk of a general strike. In response to this, Williams proclaimed a State of Emergency on 21 April and arrested 15 Black Power leaders. Responding in turn, a portion of the Trinidad Defence Force, led by Raffique Shah and Rex Lassalle, mutinied and took hostages at the army barracks at Teteron. Through the action of the Coast Guard and negotiations between the Government and the rebels, the mutiny was contained and the mutineers surrendered on 25 April. It was around this time the term Afro-Trinidadian was started to be used.

Culture
The massive influx of enslaved Africans to Trinidad and Tobago shores that happened in 19th century respectively was important in shaping the cultural space of Trinidad and Tobago. Afro-Trinidadian culture is immanent within and encapsulates all other cultures. Afro-Trinidadian culture is decisive in steelpan culture, Carnival culture and calypso culture and also helped in many ways to shape.

Religious groups

Most Afro-Trinidadian and Tobagonians are Christian, with the largest group being Roman Catholics, Anglicans and (in Tobago) Methodists. Smaller numbers follow Afro-Caribbean syncretic faiths like the Spiritual Baptist Church and the Rastafari movement. Non-Christians include adherents of Islam, the Orisha-Shango (Yoruba) faith, Afro-American religions, the Baháʼí Faith, Hinduism or are followers of Sai Baba.

See also

Slavery in the British and French Caribbean
Dougla people
Demographics of Trinidad and Tobago

References

 
Ethnic groups in Trinidad and Tobago
Trinidadian